Love & Pain is the second album by American R&B singer Eamon.

The album was initially scheduled to be released in the United States on August 1, 2006, but the domestic release was postponed indefinitely for reasons not disclosed by Eamon's label, Jive Records. The album remains available in the United States only as an import.

Track listing
"Real Pro" – 1:49 
"(How Could You) Bring Him Home" – 3:39
"Elevator" – 3:43
"I Love Fuckin (When I Call)" – 3:24
"Heatrise" – 3:18
"Love Lovin U" – 4:09
"Up & Down" – 3:16
"My Time" – 3:59
"By My Side" - 3:37
"Ho-Wop Sound (Hold Up)" – 3:51
"Older" [featuring June Luva] – 3:07
"Love & Pain" – 0:41

References

2006 albums
Eamon (singer) albums
Albums produced by Happy Perez
Jive Records albums